Lackland may refer to:

"Lackland", nickname given to King John of England
"sans Terre" ("lack land"), nickname of John of Artois, Count of Eu
Lackland Air Force Base, San Antonio, Texas
Lackland Independent School District, a public school district in San Antonio